Antillea is a genus of butterflies from Central America in the family Nymphalidae.

Species
 Antillea pelops (Drury, [1773])
 Antillea proclea (Doubleday, [1847])

References

Melitaeini
Nymphalidae of South America
Butterfly genera
Taxa named by Robert P. Higgins